World Victory Road Presents: Sengoku 8 was a mixed martial arts event promoted by World Victory Road. It took place on May 2, 2009 and featured the second round of WVR's 2009 Featherweight Grand-Prix.

Results

See also
 World Victory Road
 List of Sengoku champions
 2009 in World Victory Road

References

External links
Official fight card

World Victory Road events
2009 in mixed martial arts
Sports competitions in Tokyo